Angel Eyes is a novel by Loren D. Estleman, second in the Private Investigator Amos Walker series.

Plot summary
An exotic dancer, Ann Maringer's life is in danger, she is scared and sure someone is out to get her. Ann turns to Amos Walker the irascible private-eye from Detroit but then disappears and Walker is out to find out what happened and where she is.

External links
Amos Walker stories at Thrilling Detective

1981 American novels
American crime novels
Novels set in Detroit
Houghton Mifflin books